Attila Pinte (born 6 June 1971) is a former Slovak football player of Hungarian ethnicity who currently cooperating as an assistant manager for ŠK SFM Senec.

Pinte played in Slovakia most notably for DAC Dunajská Streda and Inter Bratislava. He won the Slovak Superliga with Inter in 2000. He also played for Ferencvárosi TC in Hungary and Panionios F.C. in Greece before returning to Slovakia. Pinte represented Slovakia internationally and was capped 31 times for the national team in 1998–2003.

References

External links
 

Slovak footballers
Slovakia international footballers
1971 births
Hungarians in Slovakia
Living people
Ferencvárosi TC footballers
FK Inter Bratislava players
Panionios F.C. players
MŠK Rimavská Sobota players
FC DAC 1904 Dunajská Streda players
FC Petržalka players
Slovak Super Liga players

Association football midfielders